A premier is a head of government, in several countries and sub-national jurisdictions.  

Premier may also refer to:

Automotives
 Premier Automobiles Limited, an Indian automobile manufacturer 
 Premier Motor Manufacturing Company, a defunct US automobile manufacturer
 Premier Motorcycles, a defunct British motorcycles manufacturer
 Eagle Premier, a car made by the Chrysler Corporation from 1988 to 1992
 Holden Premier, a car made in Australia from 1962 to 1980

Music
 Premier Radio, a Christian radio station in London
 DJ Premier an influential hip-hop DJ and producer
 The Premiers, 1960s garage band who performed "Farmer John"
 Premier, a British maker of high quality Jazz and Rock drum kits.

Organisations
 Premier (cycling team), a Russian road-racing team 2006–2007
 Premier Foods, a British-based food manufacturer
 Premier Health Partners, a hospital network company based in Dayton, Ohio
 Premier Percussion Limited, a Leicestershire-based manufacturer of drums and percussion instruments
 Premier Rides, a rollercoaster manufacturing company based in Millersvile, Maryland, USA
 Premier Stores, a symbol group of retailers in the United Kingdom

Other
 Premier, Bell County, Kentucky
 Premier, Switzerland, a town in Switzerland
 Premier, British Columbia, an abandoned mining town in British Columbia, Canada
 Premier (cigarette), a smokeless cigarette released by the R.J. Reynolds Tobacco Company
 Beechcraft Premier, a jet aircraft made by Hawker Beechcraft
 Premier Sports, a group of sports television channels broadcasting in United Kingdom

See also
 WTA Premier tournaments, the elite category of tournaments on the Women's Tennis Association
 Premier League (disambiguation)
 Premiere, a first performance
 Premiere (disambiguation), including "Première"
 Premiership (disambiguation)
 La 1ère (disambiguation), "Première", feminine of "le premier"
 First (disambiguation), premier